Cubano could mean:
 having to do with Cuba
 more specifically, a type of Cuban espresso
 a popular name for the Cuban sandwich
 El Cubano, Cuba, a town in Vega Alta Popular Council, Cuba